Benign lymphoepithelial lesion or Mikulicz' disease is a type of benign enlargement of the parotid and/or lacrimal glands.  This pathologic state is sometimes, but not always, associated with Sjögren's syndrome.

Presentation
Benign lymphoepithelial lesion is most likely to occur in adults around 50 years of age.  Approximately 60–80% of those affected are female. The gland affected has a diffuse swelling. The swelling can be asymptomatic, but mild pain can also be associated.  This condition occurs often in those with HIV infection.

Most cases of benign lymphoepithelial lesions appear in conjunction with Sjögren's syndrome. When Sjögren's syndrome is present, the swelling is usually bilateral. Otherwise, the affected glands are usually only on one side of the body.

In many cases, a biopsy is needed to distinguish benign lymphoepithelial lesions from sialadenosis (sialosis).

Locations
In 80% of cases, the parotid gland is affected.  Lacrimal glands are also affected.

Histology

There is a marked lymphoplasmacytic infiltration. Lymphoid follicles surround solid epithelial nests, giving rise to the 'epimyoepithelial islands', that are mainly composed of ductal cells with occasional myoepithelial cells. Excess hyaline basement membrane material is deposited between cells, and there is also acinar atrophy and destruction.

Treatment
Treatment usually consists of observation unless the patient has concern, there is pain, drainage, or other symptoms related to the lesion.  Surgical removal of the affected gland would be recommended in those cases.  Another treatment option would be aspiration, which can be repeated multiple times.  This is commonly performed in those who are debilitated or in those whose benefit from surgery would be outweighed by the risks.  Prognosis is usually good; rarely this condition may devolve into lymphoma, or could actually represent 'occult' lymphoma from the outset.

Eponym
Historically, bilateral parotid and lacrimal gland enlargement was characterized by the term Mikulicz's disease if the enlargement appeared apart from other diseases.  If it was secondary to another disease, such as tuberculosis, sarcoidosis, lymphoma, and Sjögren's syndrome, the term used was Mikulicz's syndrome.  Both names derive from Jan Mikulicz-Radecki, the Polish surgeon best known for describing these conditions.

In more recent times, the terms "Mikulicz's disease" and "Mikulicz's syndrome" were viewed as ambiguous and outdated by some sources.

Today Mikulicz's disease is considered to be a subtype of IgG4-related disease, usually accompanied by involvement of one or more other organs in the body.

See also
 Lymphoepithelial lesion

References 

Bibliography
 Kahn, Michael A. Basic Oral and Maxillofacial Pathology. Volume 1. 2001.
 Regezi, Joseph A. Oral Pathology: Clinical Pathologic Correlations. 4th ed. 2002.

Further reading

External links 

 Mikulicz syndrome on The National Organization for Rare Disorders (NORD)
 Benign lymphoepithelial lesions on Radiopedia

Salivary gland pathology
IgG4-related disease